Steven Haigler is an American record producer of alternative, grunge, hardcore, and popular music, notably Sunburn (1998) by Fuel, February Son (1999) by Oleander, As Good as Dead (1996) by Local H, Slip (1993) by Quicksand, and Transnational Speedway League (1993) by Clutch. His engineering credits include several Pixies albums, such as Doolittle (1989), Hunkpapa (1988) by Throwing Muses, and Workbook (1989) by Bob Mould.

References 

Year of birth missing (living people)
Living people
American record producers